Amir Bashti (born March 21, 1997) is an American soccer player who last played for USL Championship club Atlanta United 2.

Early life
Bashti was born and raised in San Jose, California. He attended Monta Vista High School in Cupertino and played youth soccer for the San Jose Earthquakes Academy. He is of Iranian descent.

College career
Bashti played four years of college soccer at Stanford University from 2015–2018. As a 4 year starter, he won 3 national titles with Stanford, recording 19 goals and 13 assists in 88 games in his collegiate career. He won Pac-12 player of the week honors twice during his senior year and was named in the All-Pac-12 first team at the end of the season.

While at college, Bashti also appeared for USL PDL side Burlingame Dragons in 2016 and 2017.

Professional career

Early career
In the 2019 MLS SuperDraft, Atlanta United selected Bashti in the second round (48th overall).

After failing to sign a contract with Atlanta, on June 28, 2019 Amir went back to California where he grew up and signed a contract with the San Francisco Glens of the USL League Two, where he played in two matches.

In August 2019, Bashti trained with the Glens' European partner club, German 2. Bundesliga side Holstein Kiel, playing in an under-23 match against Hamburg.

Atlanta United 2

On August 22, 2019, Bashti went back to Atlanta and signed a contract with their reserve side Atlanta United 2 who play in the USL Championship. He scored his first goal for the club on September 28, 2019 in a 1–1 draw at Saint Louis FC. Bashti scored his first goal of the 2020 season and provided an assist on September 23, 2020 against New York Red Bulls II. He was subsequently named in the USL Championship Team of the Week for his performance against New York.

International career

Youth
Bashti was called up to the United States men's national under-18 soccer team in December 2014 and played in a friendly match against Germany U-18 on December 19, 2014 in Marbella. He played for the U-20 team against France on September 4, 2015 and Israel on September 7, 2015 before being called into the under-20 squad by manager Tab Ramos for the Dallas Cup in March 2016. In July 2016, Bashti was named in Brad Friedel's squad for the 2016 COTIF Tournament.

Style of play
Bashti is a versatile midfielder and can play in any position in the front six; central midfield being his preferred position.

Honors

College
Stanford Cardinals
 NCAA Division I Men's Soccer Championship: 2015, 2016, 2017
 Pac-12 Conference: 2015, 2016, 2017, 2018

Individual
 First team All-Pac-12: 2018

References

1997 births
Living people
American people of Iranian descent
American soccer players
Association football midfielders
Atlanta United 2 players
Atlanta United FC draft picks
Burlingame Dragons FC players
People from Cupertino, California
San Francisco Glens players
Soccer players from San Jose, California
Sportspeople of Iranian descent
Stanford Cardinal men's soccer players
United States men's under-20 international soccer players
United States men's youth international soccer players
USL Championship players
USL League Two players